Gannett is an unincorporated community in Blaine County in the U.S. state of Idaho.

Gannett is located 8 mi (12.9 km) southeast of Bellevue on Gannett Road between State Highway 75 and U.S. Route 20.

History
Gannett's population was 20 in 1960.

References

Unincorporated communities in Blaine County, Idaho
Unincorporated communities in Idaho